The Cephalocarida are a class in the subphylum Crustacea comprising only 12 benthic species. They were discovered in 1955 by Howard L. Sanders, and are commonly referred to as horseshoe shrimp. They have been grouped together with the Remipedia in the Xenocarida. Although a second family, Lightiellidae, is sometimes used, all cephalocaridans are generally considered to belong in just one family: Hutchinsoniellidae. Though no fossil record of cephalocaridans has been found, most specialists believe them to be primitive among crustaceans.

Taxonomy
 Class Cephalocarida Sanders 1955
 Order Brachypoda Birshteyn 1960
 Family Hutchinsoniellidae Sanders 1955
 Genus Chiltoniella Knox & Fenwick 1977
 Chiltoniella elongata Knox & Fenwick 1977
 Genus Hampsonellus Hessler & Wakabara 2000
 Hampsonellus brasiliensis Hessler & Wakabara 2000
 Genus Hutchinsoniella Sanders 1955
 Hutchinsoniella macracantha Sanders 1955
 Genus Lightiella Jones 1961
 Lightiella floridana McLaughlin 1976
 Lightiella incisa Gooding 1963
 Lightiella magdalenina Carcupino et al. 2006
 Lightiella monniotae Cals & Delamare Deboutteville 1970
 Lightiella serendipita Jones 1961
 Genus Sandersiella Shiino 1965
 Sandersiella acuminata Shiino 1965
 Sandersiella bathyalis Hessler & Sanders 1973
 Sandersiella calmani Hessler & Sanders 1973
 Sandersiella kikuchii Shimomura & Akiyama 2008

Description and anatomy
These are hermaphroditic crustaceans with an elongated body that measures  in length. They have a large head, the hind edge of which covers the first thoracic segment. The thorax consists of nine limb-bearing segments (thoracic limb VIII absent in Lightiella), followed by 10 limbless abdominal segments and a telson. In the larva, all the trunk segments are ring-shaped, but more dorsoventrally flattened than in the adults. During growth the anterior segments turns into the thorax and the posterior segments which makes up the abdomen remains ring-shaped. No eyes have been observed in either the adult or larval stages, presumably because of their muddy natural habitat. The second pair of antennae is located behind the mouth; in all other crustaceans the antennae are in front of the mouth at the adult stage, and only their larvae have antennae that have the same location as adult cephalocaridans.

The mouth is located behind the large upper lip, flanked by mandibles. The first pair of maxillae is very small, and the second pair has the same structure as the following thoracic legs: a large basal part, equipped with outgrowths on the inner side, used in locomotion, a forked inner branch and two outer lobes - referred to as the "pseudoepipod" and the "exopod". The structural and functional similarity between the maxillae and the legs may be a sign of primitive organization; the maxillae are not specialized, as they are in other crustaceans.

Ecology
Cephalocaridans feed on marine detritus. To bring in food particles, they generate currents with the thoracic appendages like the branchiopods and the malacostracans. Food particles are then passed anteriorly along a ventral groove, leading to the mouthparts.

References

External links

Cephalocarida- University of California Museum of Paleontology

 
Crustacean taxonomy
Arthropod classes